GFHS may refer to:
 Glenns Ferry High School, Glenns Ferry, Idaho, United States
 Glens Falls High School, Glens Falls, New York, United States
 Godinez Fundamental High School, Santa Ana, California, United States
 Great Falls High School, Great Falls, Montana, United States